Martin Yankov Minchev (born 22 April 2001) is a Bulgarian professional footballer who plays as a winger or forward for Czech First League club Sparta Prague and the Bulgarian national team.

Career

Cherno More
Born in Varna, Minchev joined Cherno More's youth academy at the age of seven in 2008 and progressed through the age groups.

On 23 April 2017, a day after his 16th birthday, Minchev was given his professional debut by manager Georgi Ivanov in a 3–2 league victory over Lokomotiv Plovdiv, replacing Ivan Kokonov in the 76th minute. In doing so, he became Cherno More's youngest-ever first team player in the Bulgarian league, aged 16 years and one day. In the beginning of June 2017 he spent five days on trial at Serie A club Torino, where he trained with the U17 team and took part in one friendly match, scoring a hat-trick.

Minchev began to establish himself in the Cherno More first team during the 2017–18 season. On 30 March 2018, he scored his first competitive goal for the club, netting Cherno More's first in a 2–1 league victory against Pirin Blagoevgrad.

Sparta Prague
On 26 June 2020, Minchev moved abroad, signing a four-year contract with Sparta Prague.

International career

Youth teams
Minchev made his Bulgaria under-18 debut at the age of 15 in January 2017 during the 2017 Granatkin Memorial Cup. He scored his first goal in the Bulgaria's fifth game of the tournament against Slovakia on 18 January.

On 19 September 2017, Minchev made his debut for Bulgaria U17 in a friendly against Turkey U17, scoring the second consolation goal in a 2–5 home defeat.

In August 2018, Minchev took part in the Vaclav Jezek Tournament with Bulgaria U18. He scored three goals during the tournament in Vrchlabí, Czech Republic, and was named Player of the Tournament.

Senior team
After a good run of form with Cherno More, on 11 March 2019 Minchev was called up by manager Petar Hubchev to the senior Bulgarian squad for the UEFA Euro 2020 qualifying matches against Montenegro and Kosovo. He made his first senior appearance for Bulgaria in a 1–1 home draw against Montenegro on 22 March at the Vasil Levski National Stadium, coming on as a substitute for Spas Delev in the 82nd minute. Minutes later he had a great opportunity to score a winning goal, but the ball ran inches wide.

Career statistics

Club

International

References

External links

2001 births
Living people
Sportspeople from Varna, Bulgaria
Bulgarian footballers
Bulgaria youth international footballers
Bulgaria international footballers
Association football midfielders
PFC Cherno More Varna players
First Professional Football League (Bulgaria) players
AC Sparta Prague players
Expatriate footballers in the Czech Republic
Bulgarian expatriate sportspeople in the Czech Republic
Bulgaria under-21 international footballers